In the expressions in this article,

is the standard normal probability density function,

is the corresponding cumulative distribution function (where erf is the error function) and

is Owen's T function.

Owen has an extensive list of Gaussian-type integrals; only a subset is given below.

Indefinite integrals 

In these integrals, n!! is the double factorial: for even n it is equal to the product of all even numbers from 2 to n, and for odd n it is the product of all odd numbers from 1 to n ; additionally it is assumed that .

Definite integrals

References 

 

 

Gaussian functions
Gaussian function